Snoke may refer to:

 David Snoke, a physics professor at the University of Pittsburgh
 Snoke Swifty Jr, a midget racer airplane manufactured by R Snoke in 1959
 Supreme Leader Snoke, a character in the Star Wars franchise